IES College of Engineering (IESCE) is an engineering college situated in Chittilappilly, in Thrissur district, Kerala, India. The college is run by Ideal Education Society. The college is affiliated to APJ Abdul Kalam Technological University and the University of Calicut. It started functioning in August 2003.

Departments
The college has six engineering departments and two allied departments.

 Engineering departments
 Department of Mechanical Engineering
 Department of Electrical and Electronics Engineering
 Department of Civil Engineering
 Department of Computer Science and Engineering
 Department of Electronics and Communication Engineering

 Allied departments
 Department of Humanities
 Department of Placement and Training

References

External links
 

Engineering colleges in Thrissur district
All India Council for Technical Education
Colleges affiliated with the University of Calicut